James Norman Carlton Patterson (July 4, 1886 – May 25, 1961) was an American track and field athlete who competed in the 1912 Summer Olympics. He was born in Chicago, Illinois, and died in Detroit, Michigan.

In 1912 he was eliminated in the first round of the 1500 metres event after finishing third in his heat. He also competed in the exhibition baseball tournament at the 1912 Olympics.

References

External links
sports-reference.com

1886 births
1961 deaths
Baseball players from Chicago
Track and field athletes from Chicago
American male middle-distance runners
Olympic track and field athletes of the United States
Olympic baseball players of the United States
Athletes (track and field) at the 1912 Summer Olympics
Baseball players at the 1912 Summer Olympics